The William H. Ferguson House is a historic two-and-a-half-story house in Lincoln, Nebraska. It was built in 1906-1907 for William H. Ferguson, a landholder, merchant and business owner who died in 1937. It was designed in the Renaissance Revival style. It has been listed on the National Register of Historic Places since November 29, 1972.

References

		
National Register of Historic Places in Lincoln, Nebraska
Renaissance Revival architecture in Nebraska
Houses completed in 1906
1906 establishments in Nebraska